Manufacturing Hate - How Africa Was Demonized in Western Media is a 2021 non-fiction book by Milton Allimadi.

The book documents the dehumanizing and racist writing by European and American authors and explorers and how they have been used to justify the colonization of Africa.

Publication 
The book was published in 2021.

Synopsis 
The book documents how writing that dehumanizes Africans and African countries is not accidental but a deliberate effort to justify the theft of resources and violence colonization of Black people.

It covers over 2,000 years of writing, starting with Herodotus's writing circa 450 BC noting the constant fascination of Europeans with black skin colour. The majority of the book focusses on European and US colonial activities in the 19th and 20th centuries. It documents the self-promotional motivations of European travelers to Africa and their efforts to justify colonization. It notes the European surprise at Ethiopian forces winning the Battle of Adwa. The book focuses on narratives from The New York Times and its role in perpetuating racist coverage.

The Albert N’Yanza Great Basin of the Nile by Samuel Baker and Heart of Darkness by Joseph Conrad are singled out for their negative characterization of Africans as "savages" which in turn were used to justify colonization.

Critical reception 
Randall Robinson praised the book for providing the evidence about the unkindness of western reporting about Africa.

New Age described it as "excellent, well-written, concise".

References 

2021 non-fiction books
Non-fiction books about racism
Books about Africa
Books about writing
Books about writers
Books by Milton Allimadi